The Schaefer Century Theatre is a 30-minute American television anthology series sponsored by Schaefer Beer. A total of fourteen episodes aired in first-run syndication in 1952.  Among its guest stars were Natalie Wood, Bonita Granville, Garry Moore, Billy Gray, and Ruth Warrick.

External links
The Schaefer Century Theatre at CVTA with list of episodes

1950s American anthology television series
1952 American television series debuts
1952 American television series endings
English-language television shows
First-run syndicated television programs in the United States